The Stokes County Courthouse in Danbury, North Carolina, United States was designed by Wheeler & Runge in Classical Revival and Beaux Arts styles.  It was built in 1904.

It was listed on the National Register of Historic Places in 1979.

References

Courthouses on the National Register of Historic Places in North Carolina
Neoclassical architecture in North Carolina
Beaux-Arts architecture in North Carolina
Government buildings completed in 1904
Buildings and structures in Stokes County, North Carolina
County courthouses in North Carolina
National Register of Historic Places in Stokes County, North Carolina
Individually listed contributing properties to historic districts on the National Register in North Carolina
1904 establishments in North Carolina